The Men's double FITA round tetraplegic was an archery competition at the 1984 Summer Paralympics.

The Austrian archer Felix Lettner won the gold medal.

Results

References

1984 Summer Paralympics events